Liberator is an arcade game released by Atari, Inc. in 1982. It is based on the Atari Force comic book series published by DC Comics from 1982 to 1986. Liberator has been described as the opposite of Missile Command, in that the player destroys cities from space instead of defending them from the ground. Only 762 arcade machines were ever made.

The story "Code Name: Liberator" describes the premise of the arcade game in detail and was included as a special insert in two comic books cover dated January 1983. Characters and concepts from the comic exist throughout the game. In the opening screen of the arcade game, Commander Champion of the "Atari Force" asks the player to help free the galaxy from the evil Malaglon Army.

Gameplay 

The Liberator controls consist of a trackball, fire button, and shield button. The player controls a coordinated attack from four star ships at the corners of the screen. The primary target of the attack are enemy bases on a rotating planet in the center of the screen. The trackball is used to move a cross-shaped cursor. The fire button fires a missile at the cursor's location from the closest ship. The shield button is used to activate force fields around the ships. The shield can only take four hits each round, and the count is shared between all ships.

At the beginning of each level, the player is flying through outer space and spaceships fly on screen from the left and right and leave in an arc. They try to ram into the player's ships. Shields do not work during this stage.

After this stage, the player is taken to a view of a rotating planet. The most prominent enemies are red flashing missile bases. They shoot missiles, fireballs, and star balls at the player's ships. The enemy bases can also detach from the planet, turn into satellites, and orbit the planet while shooting missiles. Once all missile bases are destroyed, the player moves on to the next level. At higher levels, there is the white master base. It is very intelligent, and it can change the direction or speed of the planet rotation to avoid getting hit. At the end of each stage, the player is awarded a bonus ship for every 20,000 points.

Missiles can be destroyed, although some split into four smaller particles when destroyed. Fireballs take four hits to destroy, but they slow down on each hit. Star balls also take four hits to destroy, but return to normal speed soon after being hit.

Flying saucers sometimes appear from the planet. Flying saucers shoot a large, deadly laser which cannot be stopped.

A level select menu allows the player to start at any third level (1, 4, 7... up to 22).

Legacy
Liberator was released for Microsoft Windows, Xbox, and PlayStation 2 in 2003 as part of Atari Anthology, a collection of Atari arcade and 2600 games.

References

External links

Liberator at the Arcade History database
Atari Force Headquarters Liberator Section - an Atari Force fan site that discusses Liberator.

1982 video games
Arcade video games
Arcade-only video games
Atari arcade games
Shoot 'em ups
Trackball video games
Video games developed in the United States